Vosburg v. Putney, 80 Wis. 523, 50 N.W. 403 (Wisc. 1891), was an American torts case that helped establish the scope of liability in a battery.  The case involved an incident that occurred on February 20, 1889 in Waukesha, Wisconsin.  A 14-year-old boy, Andrew Vosburg, was kicked in his upper shin by an 11-year-old boy, George Putney, while the two were in their schoolhouse's classroom.  Unbeknownst to Putney, Vosburg had previously injured his knee, and after the incident he developed a serious infection in the area that required physicians to drain pus and excise bone, and left him with a weakness in his leg for the rest of his life.  The verdict of the lawsuit's first trial was set aside, and in the second trial the jury awarded Vosburg $2500 in compensatory damages.

The case has been labeled as "one of the most studied cases in American law" after its decision in 1891. The trial found that Putney never intended to cause Vosburg any harm, and the case is often studied in American law schools as an example of the role of intent in tort cases.  The case came three times before the Supreme Court of Wisconsin, and the court's opinions, the second one in particular, were soon selected for coursebooks on Damages and Torts and became well known to generations of students, teachers and scholars of law. Even a century later, the case "continues to stimulate thinking about the judicial process, legal doctrine and liability theory." A variety of Vosburg v. Putney briefs can be found in the external links.

Principals 
 Defendant - George Putney (tortfeasor), 11yo, male
 Plaintiff - Andrew Vosburg (contact victim), 14yo, male

Summary 
 Vosburg v. Putney exemplifies the common law Eggshell skull rule.
 This case also illustrates the well-settled proposition that the tortfeasor must take his victim as he finds him.
 Material omissions in the statement of facts in a hypothetical question will render it inadmissible.
 The fact that the plaintiff is more susceptible to injury does not mitigate a defendant's liability.

Facts 
 Defendant and plaintiff were sitting in the classroom of their Waukesha, Wisconsin school -- during school hours.
 Defendant reached across the aisle with his foot.
 Intending no harm, Defendant made contact with plaintiff at the shin of the right leg ("just below the knee").
 Plaintiff did not feel the contact due to the degree of force or shock.
 Moments later, plaintiff felt a violent pain in the place of contact.
 Plaintiff became ill, reporting vomiting and swelling so severe, it twice required surgery.
 During 2nd surgery, doctors discovered the bone had degenerated to an unrecoverable state.
 Defendant was unaware that plaintiff had sustained injury to the same leg, approximately six weeks earlier.
 Expert testimony attributed the damage and loss of limb use to the contact from defendant.

Chronology 
 Plaintiff took action against defendant alleging assault and battery.
 A lower court found for plaintiff and awarded $2,800.
 Defendant appealed. The verdict was set aside and the case was remanded with an order for a new trial.
 On second trial, jury returns a special verdict of seven parts.
 Defendant motions (JNOV) were denied, a judgment for $2,500 was granted to plaintiff.
 Defendant appeals on sixth part of the special verdict - Did defendant intend to do plaintiff harm?

Issues

 Whether the plaintiff lacked a cause of action where the jury found the "defendant, in touching the plaintiff with his foot, did not intend to do him any harm".
 Do material omissions in the statement of facts in a hypothetical question render it inadmissible?
 Is the recovery of damages limited to what an individual might reasonably be supposed to have contemplated?

Holdings 
 Sustained (yes)
 Remand, granting new trial.
 Sustained (yes)

Judgment was reversed, and the case was remanded for a new trial because of error in a ruling on an objection to certain testimony.

Rules  
 "The intention to do harm is the essence of an assault" and "If the intended act is unlawful, the intention to commit it must necessarily be unlawful."
 "there can be no rule of evidence which will tolerate a hypothetical question to an expert, calling for his opinion in a matter vital to the case, which excludes from his consideration facts already proved by a witness upon whose testimony such hypothetical question is based, when a consideration of such facts by the expert is absolutely essential to enable him to form an intelligent opinion concerning such matter."
 Brown v. C., M. & St. P. R. Co. 54 Wis. 342 - "The rule of damages in actions for torts was held [in a prior case] to be that the wrong-doer is liable for all injuries resulting directly from the wrongful act, whether they could or could not have been foreseen by him [wrong-doer].

Rationale 
 Reasoning that, such is the rule in actions for mere assaults.  However, this action was for assault and battery.  If the kicking of the plaintiff by the defendant was an unlawful act, the intention to commit it must necessarily be unlawful.
 Reasoning that, "The error in permitting the witness to answer the question is material, and necessarily fatal to the judgment."
 Reasoning that, Previously (1st appeal), it was the opinion that the complaint stated a cause of action ex contractu [out of contract] and not ex delicto [out of tort].  Governed by a different rule of damages, the previous case rules on the question of damages.

Aftermath 
Andrew Vosburg had problems with his leg which limited his activities and had to wear a brace for the rest of his life, but otherwise was able to lead a normal life. He was hired by the Milwaukee Electric Railroad and Light Company in 1900 and eventually rose to foreman. He married and had three children. He and his wife also made a living by buying, refurbishing, and selling homes. Vosburg died in 1938 at the age of 64. George Putney enrolled in the University of Wisconsin but left during his sophomore year and returned to Waukesha where he worked at his family's store. He later married and moved to Milwaukee where he became a salesman of clothing and cars. He died in 1940.

Sources 
 Allison H. Eid, Epsteinian Torts: Richard A. Epstein, Cases and Materials on Torts, 25 SEATTLE U. L. REV. 89 (2001).
 Dobbs, Dan B., Paul T. Hayden, and Ellen M. Bublick. Torts and compensation: Personal accountability and social responsibility for injury. St. Paul, MN: Thomson/West, 2009
 
 Farnsworth, Ward, and Mark F. Grady. Torts: Cases and questions. Austin: Wolters Kluwer Law & Business, 2009.
 Friedman, David D. Law's order: What economics has to do with law and why it matters. Princeton, NJ: Princeton UP, 2000.

References

External links
 Case Brief for Vosburg v. Putney 86 Wis. 278, 56 N.W. 480, 1893 Wisc. at CaseBriefs.com
 Case Brief for Vosburg v. Putney 80 Wis. 523, 50 N.W. 403 (1891) at 4lawschool.com
 Case Brief for Vosburg v. Putney 30 Wis. 523, 50 N.W. 403 (1891) at 1Lcasebriefs.com (mixed quality)
 Case Brief for Vosburg v. Putney 50 N.W. 403 (Wis. 1891) (very terse)
 Case Brief for Vosburg v. Putney 50 N.W. 403 (Wis. 1891) (single paragraph, narrative)
 Outline with Vosburg v. Putney

United States tort case law
1891 in United States case law
Wisconsin state case law
1891 in Wisconsin
Waukesha, Wisconsin
United States lawsuits
Education in Waukesha County, Wisconsin